Ripley's Game is a 2002 thriller film directed by Liliana Cavani. It is adapted from the 1974 novel Ripley's Game, the third in Patricia Highsmith's series about the murderous adventures of the anti-hero Tom Ripley. John Malkovich stars as Ripley, opposite Dougray Scott and Ray Winstone. It received positive reviews. Highsmith's novel was previously adapted in 1977 as The American Friend by director Wim Wenders, starring Dennis Hopper and Bruno Ganz.

Plot
Tom Ripley is involved in an art forgery scheme in Berlin, in partnership with British gangster Reeves. Upon finding out that Reeves has attempted to cheat him, Ripley forces Reeves' customer at gunpoint to give him the money intended for the forgeries, and kills the man’s bodyguard. He also steals back the artwork for himself, and curtly tells Reeves that their partnership is over.

Three years later, Ripley is living in a lush villa in Veneto with his wife Luisa, a harpsichordist. Invited by a neighbour to a party, Ripley overhears the host, Jonathan Trevanny, insulting his taste and alluding to his shady reputation. Ripley briefly confronts him, then sullenly leaves the party.

Reeves resurfaces, much to Ripley's annoyance, asking him to eliminate a rival mobster. Ripley recommends Trevanny for the job as revenge for the slight. Believing Trevanny, a law-abiding art framer who is dying of leukemia, to be an assassin, Reeves offers him the job for a large fee. A bewildered Trevanny initially refuses, but eventually agrees, to make sure that his wife and son are provided for after his death. Trevanny travels to Berlin under the pretense of seeing a leukemia specialist, and kills the mobster at a museum. He refuses Reeves' offer of even more money to kill another mobster, this time on a train, but relents after Reeves threatens his family.

Trevanny freezes up on the train and contemplates suicide. Ripley intervenes and the two dispatch the target and his two bodyguards in the train's toilet. Together they return home, where Trevanny vainly attempts to persuade his wife Sarah that he won the money playing roulette.

Reeves ignores Ripley's warnings to keep a low profile, fearing that the Mafia will seek reprisal for the killing and deduce who was involved. The mobsters' associates come to Italy seeking revenge, killing Reeves and leaving his body in the boot of their car. They storm Ripley's villa, but Ripley has boobytrapped his home. With Trevanny's help, Ripley kills them all.

Ripley leaves Trevanny under the assumption that all the killers have been dispatched. However, Trevanny returns home to find two surviving gangsters holding Sarah captive. Ripley spots the killers' car outside in the bushes and doubles back to Trevanny's in time to save his wife. A wounded assassin fires at Ripley, but Trevanny sacrifices himself by jumping in front of the bullet. Puzzled by Trevanny's selflessness, Ripley tries to give Sarah her husband's share of the blood money, but she spits in his face. When he leaves Sarah, the packet of money is still on the floor. That night, Ripley attends Luisa's concert as if nothing has happened, but smiles briefly at the memory of Trevanny's sacrifice.

Cast
 John Malkovich as Tom Ripley
 Dougray Scott as Jonathan Trevanny
 Ray Winstone as Reeves
 Lena Headey as Sarah Trevanny
 Chiara Caselli as Luisa Harari
 Sam Blitz as Matthew Trevanny
 Paolo Paoloni as Franco
 Evelina Meghnagi as Maria
 Lutz Winde as Ernst
 Wilfred Xander as Belinsky

Reception
The film received positive critical reviews, with a 92% "fresh" rating on Rotten Tomatoes, based on 24 reviews. Roger Ebert added Ripley's Game to his "Great Movies" list, calling it "the best of the four" Ripley films he had seen (the other three being Purple Noon, The American Friend, and The Talented Mr. Ripley) and Malkovich "precisely the Tom Ripley I imagine when I read the novels," praising what he felt to be "one of [his] most brilliant and insidious performances; a study in evil that teases the delicate line between heartlessness and the faintest glimmers of feeling." Ebert criticized the decision not to release the film theatrically in North America, writing: "The failure to open it theatrically was a shameful blunder."

Peter Travers of Rolling Stone gave the film 3.5 stars out of 4, writing: "John Malkovich, oozing danger and sinister charm, gives one of the year’s most memorable and mesmerizing performances in Ripley’s Game... Malkovich oils himself around the plot – icy cool one moment, blazingly violent the next – with a master's finesse. Highsmith wrote five Ripley novels, and other actors have played the part, most recently and most blandly Matt Damon in The Talented Mr. Ripley. But Malkovich owns the role. He plays it for keeps." David Rooney of Variety wrote "Malkovich's elegantly malicious performance gives Ripley's Game a magnetic center, complemented by Liliana Cavani's efficient direction and an enjoyable retro feel that recalls the British Cold War thrillers of the 1960s. Despite some pedestrian plotting and a final act that could be tighter, this is suspenseful adult entertainment that should find a receptive audience."

Other critics were less favorable, such as Peter Bradshaw of The Guardian, who gave the film two stars out of five. Some critics compared the film unfavorably to Wim Wenders' 1977 adaptation, The American Friend. Nathan Rabin of A.V. Club wrote "Ripley's Game fatally lacks the squirmy, desperate humanity that made Wenders' take on the same material so hauntingly tragic. Like Malkovich's suavely generic international criminal, it's all craft and no soul, with complexity and depth functioning as collateral damage for its slick thriller mechanics." Neil Young's Film Lounge gave Ripley's Game a score of 6 out of 10, calling the film a "largely uninspired" adaptation by a "pedestrian" director. This critic referred to The American Friend as "brilliant" by comparison, feeling that "any viewer who is a fan of Highsmith and/or The American Friend will have major problems with this version."

Box office
The film grossed $6.2 million on a budget of $30 million, making it a box-office failure.

Adaptations

Ripley's Game is the fourth big-screen adaptation of the Ripley character, following Purple Noon, The American Friend, and The Talented Mr. Ripley. It was followed in 2005 by the film Ripley Under Ground.

References

External links

 
 
 
 Filmografia di Liliana Cavani
 Two Faces of Ripley, filmbrain.com comparison of The American Friend and Ripley's Game

2002 films
2002 psychological thriller films
Italian psychological thriller films
British psychological thriller films
English-language Italian films
2000s German-language films
2000s Italian-language films
Films directed by Liliana Cavani
Films about organized crime in Germany
Films based on American novels
Films based on crime novels
Films based on works by Patricia Highsmith
Films set in Italy
Films set in Berlin
Films about con artists
Films with screenplays by Charles McKeown
Films scored by Ennio Morricone
Mr. Mudd films
Remakes of German films
Italian remakes of foreign films
American remakes of German films
British remakes of German films
2000s English-language films
2000s British films